Joseph Slater, Baron Slater, BEM (13 June 1904 – 21 April 1977) was a Labour Party politician in the United Kingdom.

He was elected as Member of Parliament (MP) for Sedgefield in County Durham at the 1950 general election, following the retirement of John Leslie.  Slater held the seat until he retired from the House of Commons at the 1970 general election.  In Harold Wilson's Labour Government 1964–1970, he served as Assistant Postmaster-General from 1964 to 1969, serving under four Postmasters-General: Tony Benn, Edward Short, Roy Mason and John Stonehouse.

On 8 July 1970 he was created a life peer as Baron Slater, of Ferryhill in County Durham.

References

External links 
 

1904 births
1977 deaths
Labour Party (UK) life peers
Labour Party (UK) MPs for English constituencies
National Union of Mineworkers-sponsored MPs
UK MPs 1950–1951
UK MPs 1951–1955
UK MPs 1955–1959
UK MPs 1959–1964
UK MPs 1964–1966
UK MPs 1966–1970
UK MPs who were granted peerages
Recipients of the British Empire Medal
Ministers in the Wilson governments, 1964–1970
Life peers created by Elizabeth II